Benedict Thomas Viviano  (born January 22, 1940) a New Testament scholar and author, is a member of the Chicago Province of the Dominican Order of the Roman Catholic Church. He was on the faculty of the University of Fribourg, Switzerland, as a full professor of New Testament, teaching in the French language. Before teaching in Fribourg, he taught for 11 years at the Ecole Biblique in Jerusalem , and 12 years at Aquinas Institute of Theology in St. Louis. He was vice president of the Tantur Ecumenical Institute for Theological Studies in Jerusalem.

He is probably best known for his book The Kingdom of God in History and the St. Matthew section of the New Jerome Bible Commentary.

Early life
Viviano was born in St Louis. In a city of French foundation but mainly German population with a strong African American minority, his family belonged to the city's community of Italian people, itself divided into Lombards and Sicilians. He went to Christian Brothers College High School in St. Louis. After two years of university, he entered the Dominican order in 1959 and was ordained a priest in 1966.

Viviano had been interested in Scripture since the age of 12, and was assigned to write a doctorate in that subject. His education included studies in Washington, D.C. (the Catholic University of America), Boston (Harvard University), Durham, North Carolina (Duke University), Rome (Pontifical Biblical Institute), and Jerusalem (Ecole Biblique). He spent shorter times at a rabbinical seminary in Cincinnati and at University of Tübingen and University of Vienna.

Career
His teaching life can be divided into three main periods, each of about 12 years: first in the United States at a Dominican faculty of theology, in close collaboration with a Lutheran and a Reformed seminary. He has always had a strong interest in ecumenism and also an interest in Judaism, and so has served on dialogue teams for various bishops' conferences and for the Vatican. His second teaching period was in Jerusalem. His third period of teaching, was at the University of Fribourg in Switzerland, where he was a full ordinarius professor for New Testament in French, since 1995. He has retired as Professor Emeritus of the University of Fribourg to the Dominikanerkonvent Rosenkranzbasilika St. Maria Rotunda Postgasse 4 A-1010 Vienna, Austria. Viviano also spends the fall semester each year at Aquinas Institute, 23 S. Spring Avenue St. Louis, Missouri.

His special interests are in the Gospel according to Matthew and its Jewish background, and, for biblical theological themes, the kingdom of God in history. He also has an interest in the religious value of study and intellectual life. He therefore mentors others who feel called to pursue studies, and offers counsel as to where to study and with whom.

Besides having published books and essays in these areas, Viviano’s side interests include the relation between Matthew and the Gospel according to John the Evangelist, a theology of democracy, the philosophy of history (Hegel), the theology of hope. Retired as a full professor in 2008, Viviano continues to lecture and to write.

According to the author, his most important works are "Study as Worship"; the "Commentary on Matthew in the New Jerome Biblical Commentary" and "The Kingdom of God in History."

Teaching experience
1972-1976 Instructor in New Testament, Aquinas Institute of Theology, Dubuque, Iowa
1976-1978 Assistant Professor of New Testament, Aquinas Institute of Theology, Dubuque, Iowa
1978-1981 Professor of New Testament, Aquinas Institute of Theology, Dubuque, Iowa.
1981-1984: Professor of New Testament, Aquinas Institute, St. Louis
1984-1995: Professor of New Testament, Ecole Biblique, Jerusalem (1989: full professor ordinarius)
1995-2008: Professor of New Testament, University of Fribourg, Switzerland

Educational background
1962 - BA (Philosophy), Aquinas Institute of Philosophy, River Forest.
1963 - MA (Philosophy), Aquinas Institute of Philosophy, River Forest, Illinois.
1966 - MA (Theology), Aquinas Institute of Theology, Dubuque, Iowa.
1967 - ST.Lic., S.T.Lr. (Theology), Pontifical Faculty of the Immaculate Conception, Washington, D.C.
1969 - SSB (New Testament), Pontifical Biblical Institute, Rome, Italy.
1976 - PhD (Bible), Duke University, Durham, North Carolina.
1977 - SSL Pontifical Biblical Commission, Rome, Italy (cum mentione speciali).

Selected works

Books

as Editor
  - editor of the NT section.

Chapters

Journal articles

Notes

References
Jerome Murphy-O’Connor The Ecole Biblique and the New Testament: A Century of Scholarship (1890–1990) NTOA13; Göttingen: Vandenhoeck & Ruprecht, 1990. pp. 138–142
University of Fribourg, Faculty of Theology
Who’s Who in Biblical Studies and Archaeology, ed. Hershel Shanks. Washington DC: Biblical Archaeology Society, 1987. page 231;  / 9780961308933

External links
https://web.archive.org/web/20090904074051/http://www.spiritualitytoday.org/spir2day/823424viviano.html
https://openlibrary.org/a/OL2649452A/Benedict_T._Viviano
University of Fribourg Web page for Viviano
 https://web.archive.org/web/20140516181257/http://www.domlife.org/Books/BenedictVivianoBooks.html
 https://wipfandstock.com/advancedsearch/search?search_type=keyword&keyword=Viviano&go_search_btn.x=9&go_search_btn.y=12
 https://web.archive.org/web/20090904074051/http://www.spiritualitytoday.org/spir2day/823424viviano.html

1940 births
American biblical scholars
Roman Catholic biblical scholars
Academic staff of the University of Fribourg
Catholic University of America alumni
Harvard University alumni
University of Tübingen alumni
Duke University alumni
University of Vienna alumni
Pontifical Biblical Institute alumni
Aquinas Institute of Theology faculty
American people of Italian descent
Living people
New Testament scholars
Dominican theologians
Writers from St. Louis